The World Athletics Cross Country Tour is an annual series of cross country running competitions which are recognised by the World Athletics (formerly known as the IAAF). Athletes accumulate points in the series' cross country meets during the season, which typically begins in September and finishes in March, with top three performances counting towards the standings. The inaugural season was 2021–22. The Tour replaced the IAAF Cross Country Permit series, which was first held in 1999.

Starting with the 2023 World Athletics Championships, the Cross Country Tour and the cross country rankings form part of the qualification pathway for the 10,000 metres event at championships and Olympics. The top eight men and top eight women in the cross country rankings, who are not already qualified via entry standard or world 10,000 m ranking, are automatically qualified.

The Cross Country Tour is divided into three levels – Gold, Silver and Bronze.

Editions

Gold standard meetings

The number in the table represents the order in which the meeting took place.

Winners

Men

Women

References

Recurring sporting events established in 2021
Cross country running competitions
Annual athletics series
Cross Country Tour